Jewish War can refer to:

The Jewish War by the Jewish historian Josephus
The First Jewish–Roman War of 66–73 AD (see also Jewish–Roman wars)
An anti-Semitic campaign by Polish newspaper Gazeta Warszawska known as The Jewish war of 1859
Jewish war against Nazi Germany, a conspiracy theory asserting that World War II was caused by Jews
Antisemitic canard that Jews cause wars

Judaism and warfare